Truppe is a surname. Notable people with the surname include: 

Katharina Truppe (born 1996), Austrian skier
Susan Truppe (born 1959), Canadian politician